Unity College may refer to:

Unity College Northampton in the United Kingdom
Unity College (Burnley) in the United Kingdom
Unity College (Caloundra) in Australia
Unity College (Maine) in the United States
Unity College (Lucknow) in India

See also
Unity Academy (disambiguation)
Unity (disambiguation)